Forest Green, Oh Forest Green is the first single by American singer-songwriter Holly Miranda from her album The Magician's Private Library, released 9 November 2009 in the UK and 17 November 2009 in the United States by XL Recordings. It was co-written and features guest vocals by musician Brendan Coon.

Critical reception
Ben Schumer of PopMatters described the song as "the album's lone knockout: a woozy, twinkling march greatly abetted by the Antibalas horn section," yet noted, "Miranda sounds like a guest on her own song."

Track listing

Release history

References

External links
 Holly Miranda official site
 Holly Miranda Myspace
 [ Holly Miranda] on AllMusic
 "Forest Green Oh Forest Green" live at Bowery Ballroom 06/15/10

Holly Miranda songs
2009 debut singles
XL Recordings singles
2009 songs